Eduardo Saporiti (born 29 December 1954) is an Argentine footballer. He played in four matches for the Argentina national football team from 1979 to 1984. He was also part of Argentina's squad for the 1979 Copa América tournament.

References

External links
 

1954 births
Living people
Argentine footballers
Argentina international footballers
Association football defenders
Sportspeople from Córdoba Province, Argentina